Anna Pilipenko (born 25 December 1988) is a Belarusian footballer who plays as a midfielder for Premier League club Dinamo Minsk and the Belarus women's national team.

International goals

References

External links 
 

1988 births
Living people
Women's association football midfielders
Belarusian women's footballers
Sportspeople from Brest, Belarus
Belarus women's international footballers
Russian Women's Football Championship players
Ryazan-VDV players
FC Minsk (women) players
Gintra Universitetas players
Belarusian expatriate footballers
Belarusian expatriate sportspeople in Russia
Expatriate women's footballers in Russia
Belarusian expatriate sportspeople in Lithuania
Expatriate women's footballers in Lithuania